Peter James Scott Lumsden, CBE (20 February 1929 – 15 October 2017) was a British motorsport competitor who gained renown between 1959 and 1965 racing at Le Mans, the Nürburgring, Silverstone & Goodwood before twice winning at Brands Hatch in his final season in 1965. He is the younger son of Lieutenant-General Herbert Lumsden and brother of Michael.

Racing career
Lumsden started racing in 1956 with the Lotus-Climax Mk IX, enjoying considerable success including victory in his first sortie at Goodwood. This together with numerous other second and third places brought him the prestigious Motor Sport Brooklands Memorial Trophy at the end of his first season. After a less rewarding year in 1957 with a Lotus Eleven, Lumsden acquired the third Lotus Elite prototype (WUU2) in late 1958.

Lumsden raced the Elite extensively in 1959. After winning the 1300 cc GT class in the Nürburgring 1000 km round of the World Sports Car Championship with co-driver Peter Riley, the pair took part in the prestigious Le Mans 24 Hours. Winner that year was Carroll Shelby with co-driver Roy Salvadori in the Aston Martin DBR1/300 but the two Peters finished a respectable 8th overall, 1st in the 1500 cc GT class, 2nd in the newly instigated Index of Thermal Efficiency and 5th in the Index of Performance. 

In 1960 Lumsden began his partnership with co-driver Peter Sargent at the Nürburgring 1000 Ks, finishing second in the 1300 cc GT class to the Team Elite entry for Alan Stacey and John Wagstaff. Driving solo, Peter Lumsden then won the 1300 CC GT class of the 1960 RAC Tourist Trophy at Goodwood, finishing ninth overall behind various Ferraris and Aston Martins plus Graham Hill's Porsche Carrera Abarth and 5.2 seconds ahead of Graham Warner's famous Elite LOV 1 after three hours of racing.

In Lumsden & Riley's final season in the Elite in 1961 they again produced a 1300 cc GT class win in the Nürburgring 1000 km. In the TT later that year, Lumsden driving solo had to settle for second in class to Les Leston's Elite DAD 10, whilst finishing eighth overall.

In 1961 Lumsden and his now permanent co-driver Peter Sargent were able to acquire one of the earliest (898 BYR) E-Types off the production line at Jaguar. This was a measure of Lumsden & Sargent's standing as drivers as these cars were provided exclusively to influential motor sport teams and drivers as a result of supply problems at the Jaguar factory. In late September 1961 a fifth place in the Molyslip Trophy at Snetterton behind Mike Parkes (Ferrari 250GT Berlinetta), Roy Salvadori (E-type) and Innes Ireland (Aston Martin DB4GT), and ahead of all the other E-types, was an encouraging debut while the high point of the following year was Le Mans where the two Peters finished fifth overall, and second in the 4-litre GT class behind the Roy Salvadori/Briggs Cunningham E-type. With little more than an hour of the race remaining, 898 BYR was several laps ahead of the Cunningham car when the gearbox became stuck in fourth gear and they could only tour round to the finish.

The Jaguar E-Type lightweight '49 FXN'
In 1963 Lumsden & Sargent acquired a Jaguar Lightweight E-Type (vehicle number 49 FXN), one of only 12 built at the time. On its debut in the 1963 Nurburgring 1000 km, Lumsden crashed 49 FXN badly and was fortunate to escape with his life. The car was returned to the Jaguar factory to be rebuilt and subsequently underwent extensive aerodynamic revision under Dr Samir Klat of Imperial College. On returning to competition in 1964, the car was timed at 168 mph on the Mulsanne straight during the Le Mans test weekend but failed to complete the race itself due to gearbox failure. Lumsden's best result of his few races in the car that year was eighth overall, fifth in class, in the Goodwood TT. Peter Sargent retired from racing at the end of that year but Peter Lumsden retained the car for one more season, winning a couple of victories in club races at Brands Hatch but no longer competitive against the new generation of Cobras and Ferrari 250GT0s. For his last visit to the Nürburgring, Lumsden shared Peter Sutcliffe's Ferrari 250GTO to win the 3-litre GT class. At the end of the 1965 season Peter Lumsden joined Peter Sargent in racing retirement and 49 FXN was sold and in due course became one of the most sought after low drag light weight E-types of all time, known as 49 FXN or the Lumsden/Sargent car.

Retirement
A chartered accountant by qualification, when Lumsden left the London Stock Exchange he took up farming near Dover. In 1995 he was appointed a CBE for services to healthcare

References

1929 births
2017 deaths
British racing drivers
Commanders of the Order of the British Empire